Vicente Vera (born 10 May 1936) is a Chilean alpine skier. He competed at the 1956, 1960 and the 1964 Winter Olympics.

References

1936 births
Living people
Chilean male alpine skiers
Olympic alpine skiers of Chile
Alpine skiers at the 1956 Winter Olympics
Alpine skiers at the 1960 Winter Olympics
Alpine skiers at the 1964 Winter Olympics
Place of birth missing (living people)
20th-century Chilean people